Natalina is a genus of medium-sized predatory air-breathing land snails, carnivorous terrestrial pulmonate gastropod molluscs in the family Rhytididae.

Species
Species within the genus Natalina include:
 Natalina beyrichi (E. von Martens, 1890) (Pondoland cannibal snail)
 Natalina cafra (A. Férussac, 1821)
 Natalina quekettiana (Melvill & Ponsonby, 1893)
 Natalina reenenensis Connolly, 1939
 Natalina wesseliana (Kobelt, 1876) (Tongaland cannibal snail)

References

 Nomenclator Zoologicus info
 Herbert, D.G. & Moussalli A. 2010. Revision of the larger cannibal snails (Natalina s. l.) of southern Africa - Natalina s. s., Afrorhytida and Capitina (Mollusca: Gastropoda: Rhytididae). African Invertebrates 51 (1): 1-132. 

Rhytididae
Taxa named by Henry Augustus Pilsbry
Gastropod genera
Taxonomy articles created by Polbot